Priti is a village development committee in Ramechhap District in the Janakpur Zone of north-eastern Nepal. At the time of the 1991 Nepal census it had a population of 4,660 people living in 948 individual households.

Around 80 percent of people in Priti are Sunuwar.

References

External links
UN map of the municipalities of Ramechhap District

Populated places in Ramechhap District